Dunavtsi or Dounavtsi (in Bulgarian: Дунавци) may refer to:
 Dunavtsi - a city in Vidin Municipality, Vidin Province, Bulgaria
 Dunavtsi, Stara Zagora Province - a village in Kazanlak Municipality, Stara Zagora Province, Bulgaria
 Dunavtsi, Veliko Tarnovo Province - a village in Veliko Tarnovo Municipality, Veliko Tarnovo Province, Bulgaria